Mordellaria arakii is a species of beetle in the genus Mordellaria of the family Mordellidae. It was described in 1950.

References

Beetles described in 1950
Mordellidae